Diogo António Alberto (born 1 March 1989), known simply as Diogo, is a Mozambican footballer who currently plays as a midfielder for Clube Ferroviário de Maputo. He made 31 appearances for the Mozambique national team.

External links 
 
 

1989 births
Living people
Mozambican footballers
Mozambique international footballers
Association football midfielders
CD Chingale players
CD Costa do Sol players
UD Songo players
Clube Ferroviário de Maputo footballers
People from Tete Province
2014 African Nations Championship players
Mozambique A' international footballers